Bolborhynchus is a genus of parrot in the family Psittacidae.

It contains the following species:

 
Bird genera
Psittacidae
Taxa named by Charles Lucien Bonaparte
Taxonomy articles created by Polbot